Ken LaCosse (born April 9, 1960 in San Jose, California, died June 28, 2019 in San Francisco, CA) was an American maker of the shakuhachi (Japanese bamboo flute). He is known particularly for developing a large, wide bore style of shakuhachi called Taimu, with input from shakuhachi player Brian Ritchie.

References

Recordings
2007 - Taimu - Brian Tairaku Ritchie and Shakuhachi Club MKE (Producer)

External links
http://www.mujitsu.com

1960 births
Living people
Shakuhachi players
Musicians from California